This is a list of memorials to George Washington, the commander-in-chief of the Continental Army during the American Revolutionary War and first president of the United States.

Federal holiday
Washington's Birthday has been a federal holiday in the United States since 1879.

States, counties, and townships

One of the United States, 31 counties, and 241 civil townships are named for George Washington.

Municipalities and inhabited areas

Institutions
 Central Washington University in Ellensburg, Washington
 Eastern Washington University in Cheney, Washington
 George Washington University in Washington, D.C.
 University of Washington in Seattle, Washington
 Washington and Jefferson College in Washington, Pennsylvania
 Washington and Lee University in Lexington, Virginia
 Washington College in Chestertown, Maryland
 Washington State University in Pullman, Washington
 Washington University in St. Louis, Missouri
 Western Washington University in Bellingham, Washington

Forts
 Fort Washington, New York. A fortified position near the north end of Manhattan Island during the American Revolutionary War
 Fort Washington, Ohio. A frontier outpost at Cincinnati
 Fort Washington, Massachusetts. A still-extant earthworks fortification in Cambridge, Massachusetts from the 1775–1776 Siege of Boston
 Fort Washington, Maryland
 Fort Washington, Pennsylvania. Headquarters during the December 5–8, 1777 Battle of White Marsh. Now a state park.

Estates
 Washington Place, Honolulu, private residence of Queen Liliuokalani of Hawaii

Geological features
Lake Washington
Mount Washington
Washington Peak
Washington Park
Washington Heights
Washington Island (Wisconsin)

Parks
 Washington's Crossing, National Historic Landmark
 Washington Crossing State Park, New Jersey
 Washington Crossing Historic Park, Pennsylvania
 Washington Park, Florida
 Washington Park, Illinois
 Washington Park, North Carolina
 Washington Place (Baltimore) – part of a set of four matching squares/parks around the circle of the Washington Monument. Washington Place are the two squares/parks along Charles Street's north–south axis, and the intersecting other squares/parks are along East and West Monument Street, also known as Mount Vernon Place on the east–west axis, in the north Baltimore neighborhood of Mount Vernon. 
 Washington Square Park, New York City
Washington Square Park, Philadelphia
 Washington Square (Salt Lake City, Utah)

Neighborhoods
 Mount Washington, Baltimore
 Washington Heights, Chicago
 Washington Heights, Manhattan
 Washington's Landing, Pittsburgh
 Washington Park, Atlanta
 Washington Square West, Philadelphia
 Washington Terrace, St. Louis
 Washington-Wheatley, Kansas City

Transportation
 George Washington Bridge, crossing the Hudson River between New Jersey to New York
 George Washington Memorial Parkway in Washington, D.C.,  maintained by the U.S. National Park Service
 Washington Bridge, across the Harlem River in New York City
 Washington Bridge (Providence) in Providence, Rhode Island
 Washington Crossing Bridge, across the Delaware River
 Washington Crossing Bridge (Pittsburgh), in Pittsburgh, Pennsylvania
 Washington Circle in the District of Columbia
 Washington Avenue (disambiguation), several streets

Monuments

United States

Washington, D.C.
Copy after Bust of George Washington by Giuseppe Ceracchi (1795), White House.
Enthroned Washington (1840), by Horatio Greenough, for the United States Capitol. Now in the National Museum of American History.
Washington Resigning His Commission (ca. 1841), by Ferdinand Pettrich, Smithsonian American Art Museum
Washington Monument (1848–84), Robert Mills, architect, National Mall. The best-known monument to Washington.
Equestrian statue of George Washington (1860), by Clark Mills, Washington Circle
The George Washington University (1904). Founded as Columbian College (1821), the name was changed in agreement with the George Washington Memorial Association (1904). Statues in University Yard and elsewhere on main campus.
Copy (1909) after George Washington by Jean-Antoine Houdon (1791), United States Capitol rotunda
Copy (1932) after George Washington by Jean-Antoine Houdon (1791), George Washington University
Copy after George Washington by Jean-Antoine Houdon (1791), Larz Anderson House
Copy after George Washington by Jean-Antoine Houdon (1791), inside the Washington Monument
George Washington (1934–65), by Lee Lawrie, Washington National Cathedral
Stained glass window of George Washington at Prayer (1954–55), Congressional Prayer Room, United States Capitol
George Washington on Horseback (1959), by Herbert Haseltine, Washington National Cathedral
Bust of George Washington (1975), by Avard Fairbanks, George Washington University

California
Washington Tree, Sequoia National Park. Second-tallest tree in the world, prior to a 2003 lightning strike and 2005 collapse.
Washington Square Park, San Francisco (1847)
George Washington (1870s), by Thomas Ball, Washington Monument, Forest Lawn Memorial Park, Glendale, Los Angeles
Copy (1933) after George Washington by Jean-Antoine Houdon (1791), Civic Center, Los Angeles
George Washington High School, San Francisco (1936)
The school contains a copy of Houdon's George Washington. Its 13 "Life of Washington" murals (1936) by Victor Arnautoff are threatened with removal, as of Summer 2019.

Colorado
Washington Park, Denver (1899)

Connecticut
George Washington as Master Mason (1959, this cast 1965), by Donald De Lue, Masonicare Health Center, Wallingford

Georgia
George Washington National Highway, begins in Savannah, Georgia and ends in Seattle, Washington
George Washington – "Iron George" (circa 1841), by Alonzo Blanchard, Stone Mountain Park, Stone Mountain
Washington Park, Atlanta (1919). The first non-segregated public park in the city.

Illinois
Washington Square Park, Chicago (1842)
Washington Park, Chicago (1880)
Washington Park, Springfield (1901)
Equestrian statue of George Washington (1900–04), by Daniel Chester French and Edward Clark Potter, Washington Park, Chicago. A replica of French & Potter's statue in Paris, France.
Copy (1917) of George Washington by Jean-Antoine Houdon (1791), Chicago City Hall, Chicago
George Washington – Robert Morris – Haym Salomon Monument (1936–41), by Lorado Taft, Heald Square, Chicago
Bust of George Washington by Avard Fairbanks, in downtown Peoria, gift of George Washington University on the occasion of the Creve Coeur Club of Peoria's 100th George Washington Banquet

Indiana
George Washington (ca. 1955), by L. Frizzi, Washington Park Cemetery, Indianapolis
George Washington as Master Mason (1959, this cast 1986), by Donald De Lue, Indiana Statehouse, Indianapolis

Iowa
Washington Park, Dubuque (1857)

Louisiana
Washington Oak, Audubon Park, New Orleans
George Washington as Master Mason (1959), by Donald De Lue, Main Branch, New Orleans Public Library, New Orleans. Replicas are in Flushing, Queens, New York City (1964), Wallingford, Connecticut (1965), Alexandria, Virginia (1966), Detroit, Michigan (1966), Lexington, Massachusetts (1979), Lansing, Michigan (1982), and Indianapolis, Indiana (1987).

Maine
Washington Academy, a boarding school in East Machias, founded in 1792

Maryland
Washington College, Chestertown. Chartered in 1782 as the College at Chester, it was renamed for Washington by 1783.
Washington Monument (1815–29), Robert Mills, architect, Enrico Causici, sculptor, Mount Vernon Place, Baltimore
Washington Monument (Washington County) (1827), Washington Monument State Park, Boonsboro. The first completed monument to Washington.
George Washington (1857), by Edward Sheffield Bartholomew, Druid Hill Park, Baltimore
George Washington (1947), by Lee Lawrie, Washington College, Chestertown. A bronze version of Lawrie's marble statue at the National Cathedral in Washington, DC.

Massachusetts
Equestrian statue of George Washington (1869), by Thomas Ball, Public Garden, Boston
Copy (ca. 1910) after George Washington by Jean-Antoine Houdon (1791), Forest Park, Springfield
George Washington Memorial Highway (1932), Waltham to West Springfield
George Washington as Master Mason (1959, this cast 1979), by Donald De Lue, National Heritage Museum, Lexington
Copy after George Washington by Jean-Antoine Houdon (1791), National Heritage Museum, Lexington

Michigan
George Washington as Master Mason (1959, this cast 1966), by Donald De Lue, Old Mariners Church, Detroit
George Washington as Master Mason (1959, this cast 1982), by Donald De Lue, Lewis Cass State Office Building, Lansing
George Washington (2003), by Anthony Frudakis, Hillsdale College, Hillsdale
Bust of George Washington, George Washington Masons Memorial, Michigan Memorial Garden Cemetery, Flat Rock

Minnesota
Foshay Tower (1929), Minneapolis
Copy (1931) after George Washington by Jean-Antoine Houdon (1791), Fair Oaks Park, Minneapolis (Toppled November 2020)
George Washington (1937), by John K. Daniels, Mower County Courthouse, Austin

Missouri
Washington University in St. Louis, St. Louis. Chartered as Eliot Seminary in 1853, it was renamed Washington Institute in 1854, renamed Washington University in 1856, and renamed Washington University in St. Louis in 1976
Copy (1856) of George Washington by Jean-Antoine Houdon (1791), Lafayette Park, St. Louis
Washington Terrace (St. Louis), a gated community founded about 1892
George Washington Memorial (1925), Kansas City. A copy after Henry Shrady's equestrian statue in Brooklyn, New York.
Copy (2003) of George Washington by Jean-Antoine Houdon (1791), Washington University in St. Louis

New Hampshire
Mount Washington, Mount Washington State Park

New Jersey
George Washington, by Mahlon Dickerson Eyre, Montgomery Plaza, Trenton. Exhibited at the 1876 Centennial Exposition in Philadelphia, Pennsylvania.
Colossal statue of George Washington, Father of His Country (1891–93), by William Rudolf O'Donovan, atop Trenton Battle Monument, Trenton
George Washington, the Father of His Country (1896), by Nels N. Alling, Perth Amboy City Hall, Perth Amboy
George Washington (1912), by J. Massey Rhind, Washington Park, Newark
Bas-relief of General George Washington (1916), by Mahonri Mackintosh Young, Leonia Presbyterian Church, Leonia
George Washington at Valley Forge (1918), by Carlo Abate, Camden County Hall of Justice, Camden
 Princeton Battle Monument (1922) by Frederick MacMonnies, Princeton, New Jersey
George Washington (1927–1928), by Frederick Roth, Washington's Headquarters, Morristown
George Washington Kneeling in Prayer (1991), by Donald De Lue (completed by Granville Carter), George Washington Memorial Park, Paramus. A copy of De Lue's 1967 statue is at the Freedoms Foundation in Valley Forge, Pennsylvania.

New York

New York City
Bust of George Washington (1795), by Giuseppe Ceracchi, Metropolitan Museum of Art
Washington Square Park (1826). Created as Washington Military Parade Ground; renamed 1871. Bounded by Waverly Place, University Place (Washington Square East), West 4th Street (Washington Square South), and Macdougal Street (Washington Square West).
Equestrian statue of George Washington (1856), by Henry Kirke Brown, Union Square, Manhattan. This was the first equestrian statue of Washington.
George Washington (1882), by John Quincy Adams Ward, in front of Federal Hall National Memorial, Wall Street, Manhattan
Washington Square Arch (1892), Stanford White, architect, Washington Square Park, Manhattan. Two statues were later added:
George Washington as Commander-in-Chief, Accompanied by Fame and Valor (1914–16), by Hermon MacNeil
George Washington as President, Accompanied by Wisdom and Justice (1916–18), by Alexander Stirling Calder
Equestrian statue of George Washington at Valley Forge (1901–06), by Henry Shrady, Continental Army Plaza, Brooklyn
General George Washington in Prayer at Valley Forge (1904), by James E. Kelly, Federal Hall National Memorial, Manhattan
George Washington Bridge (1930), over Hudson River
Copy (ca. 1930) after George Washington by Jean-Antoine Houdon (1791), City College of New York, Manhattan
George Washington as Master Mason (1959, this cast 1964), by Donald De Lue, Flushing Meadows–Corona Park, Queens. Exhibited at the 1964 New York World's Fair.

Outside New York City
Washington Park, Albany (1870)
George Washington (1886–87), by William Rudolf O'Donovan, housed in the base of the Tower of Victory, Washington's Headquarters State Historic Site, Newburgh
Copy after George Washington by Jean-Antoine Houdon (1791), United States Military Academy, West Point
George Washington Monument (1916), United States Military Academy, West Point. A replica of Henry Kirke Brown's Union Square, Manhattan, equestrian statue (1856).
Copy (1932) after George Washington by Jean-Antoine Houdon (1791), Alfred E. Smith Building, Albany
George Washington (1932), unknown Italian sculptor, Washington Square Park, Clyde
The Vision (George Washington at Valley Forge) (1959), by Benjamin Thorne Gilbert, Utica Public Library, Utica
George Washington (1976), by Josip Turkalj, Old County Hall, Buffalo

North Carolina
Copy (1857) after George Washington by Jean-Antoine Houdon (1791), North Carolina State Capitol, Raleigh
Copy (1910) plaster, after George Washington by Antonio Canova (1820, destroyed by fire 1831), North Carolina Museum of History, Raleigh
Copy (1970) after George Washington by Antonio Canova (1820, destroyed by fire 1831), North Carolina State Capitol, Raleigh

Ohio
Washington Park, Cincinnati (1863)
Copy (1860 by William James Hubard) of George Washington by Jean-Antoine Houdon (1791), Alumni Hall, Miami University, Oxford
George Washington Monument (1972–73), by William McVey, Washington Square, Anthony J. Celebrezze Federal Building, Cleveland

Oklahoma
George Washington (1987), by Yon Sim Pak, Rogers State University, Claremore

Oregon
Mount Washington (Oregon)
Washington Park, Portland (1909)
George Washington (1927), by Pompeo Coppini, Friendship Masonic Lodge 160, Portland (Toppled in June 2020)

Pennsylvania
George Washington (1815), by William Rush, now in Second Bank of the United States, Philadelphia
Washington Square, Philadelphia. Set aside as a public park by William Penn in 1682, it was named for Washington in 1825. 
George Washington (1869), by Joseph A. Bailly, in front of Independence Hall, Philadelphia. This bronze replica was installed in 1910; the original marble is now in Philadelphia City Hall.
George Washington Memorial (1891), by Edward Ludwig Albert Pausch, Allegheny Commons Park, Pittsburgh
Washington Monument (1893), by Frank Carlucci, Lackawanna County Courthouse, Scranton
Washington Monument (Philadelphia) (1897), by Rudolf Siemering. Relocated 1928, to in front of the Philadelphia Museum of Art.
Washington Memorial Chapel (1903–17), Milton B. Medary architect, Valley Forge National Park, Valley Forge
Valley Forge (Seated Washington) (1879), by Franklin Simmons. A bronze statuette in the chancel.
George Washington Window, by Nicola D'Ascenzo. A stained glass window depicting 36 scenes from Washington's life.
National Patriots Bell Tower (1950–53), Zantzinger & Borie, architects. Houses the 58-bell Washington Memorial National Carillon.
George Washington by C. Paul Jennewein (1953), on exterior of the National Patriots Bell Tower
Copy (1910) after George Washington by Jean-Antoine Houdon (1785–91), Jefferson Memorial Park, Pittsburgh
George Washington (1917), unknown sculptor, Washington Crossing Monument, Washington Crossing Historic Park, Washington Crossing
George Washington (1921–22), by C. S. Kilpatrick, Fort Leboeuf Museum, Waterford
Copy (1922) after George Washington by Jean-Antoine Houdon (1791), Tomb of the Unknown Revolutionary War Soldier (1956), Washington Square, Philadelphia
Copy (1931) after George Washington by Jean-Antoine Houdon (1791), Washington's HeadquartersValley Forge National Park
George Washington Kneeling in Prayer (1967), by Donald De Lue, Freedoms Foundation, Valley Forge
Washington Crossing the Delaware (1974–76), by Frank Arena, Washington Crossing Historic Park, Washington Crossing. A near-lifesize sculpture group based on Emanuel Leutze's 1851 painting.

Rhode Island
Half-size copy after George Washington by Jean-Antoine Houdon (1791), Redwood Library and Athenaeum, Newport

South Carolina
Copy after George Washington by Jean-Antoine Houdon (1791), South Carolina Statehouse, Columbia

South Dakota
George Washington (1999–2000), by Lee Leuning, Rapid City
Mount Rushmore (1924–1941), by Gutzon Borglum; along with Thomas Jefferson, Theodore Roosevelt and Abraham Lincoln

Texas
George Washington (1955), by Pompeo Coppini, in front of Main Building, University of Texas at Austin
Washington's Birthday Celebration Building, Laredo
George Washington (1990), by Roberto Garcia, Jr., City Hall, Laredo.

Utah
Washington Square, Salt Lake City. Site of the first Utah Statehouse (1896–1916).

Virginia
George Washington (1785–1791), by Jean-Antoine Houdon, Virginia State Capitol, Richmond
 George Washington (1844), Old George, by Matthew Kahle, atop Washington Hall at Washington and Lee University, Lexington
Copy (1856) cast by William James Hubard after George Washington by Jean-Antoine Houdon (1791), Virginia Military Institute, Lexington
Washington Monument (1849–1857), by Thomas Crawford, Capitol Square, Richmond
George Washington Masonic National Memorial (1923–1932), Harvey Wiley Corbett, architect, Alexandria:
Massive bronze statue of Illustrious Brother George Washington (1949–50), by Bryant Baker
Mural of George Washington Laying the Cornerstone of the United States Capitol (1952–1955), by Allyn Cox
George Washington as Master Mason (1959, this cast 1966), by Donald De Lue
Gen. George Washington, by Cyd Player, Historic Yorktown (Riverwalk Landing)
George Washington Memorial Parkway, authorized by Congress 1930, first section opened 1932
George Washington National Forest, western Virginia and eastern West Virginia. Established as Shenandoah National Forest (1918). Name changed to honor George Washington (1932). Natural Bridge National Forest added (1933).
Copy of George Washington by Jean-Antoine Houdon (1791), University of Virginia, Charlottesville

Washington (state)
George, Washington, Grant County, a city in Eastern Washington
Lake Washington, King County, east of Seattle
Mount Washington, Cascade Mountains, King County
Mount Washington, Olympic Mountains, Mason County
Statue of George Washington (1909), by Lorado Taft, University of Washington, Seattle

Wisconsin
Washington Monument (1885), by Richard Henry Park, Court of Honor, Milwaukee
Copy (1911) after George Washington by Jean-Antoine Houdon (1791), Oshkosh

Wyoming
George Washington Memorial Park (Jackson, Wyoming), dedicated 1932, rededicated 1975

Argentina

Colombia
Copy after George Washington by Jean-Antoine Houdon (1791), Barranquilla

France
La Fayette and Washington (1890–1900), by Auguste Bartholdi, Place des États-Unis, Paris
Equestrian statue of George Washington (1900), by Daniel Chester French and Edward Clark Potter, Place d'Iéna, Paris
Copy after George Washington by Jean-Antoine Houdon (1791), Saint-Martin-de-Ré

Hungary
George Washington, Father of American Democracy (1906), by Gyula Bezerédi, City Park, Budapest. A gift from Hungarian-Americans.

Mexico

George Washington (1910–12, destroyed), by Pompeo Coppini, Plaza Washington, Colonia Juárez, Mexico City. A gift from Americans commemorating the 1910 centennial of Mexican Independence, the statue was toppled and dragged through the streets in reaction to the 1914 United States invasion of Veracruz.
 Another Statue of George Washington was presented to the city by the United States government in 1916.

Peru
Copy after George Washington by Jean-Antoine Houdon (1791), Lima

Thailand
Washington Square Soi, Bangkok

United Kingdom
Copy (1921) after George Washington by Jean-Antoine Houdon (1791), in front of National Gallery, Trafalgar Square, London

Venezuela
George Washington (1883), by William Rudolf O'Donovan, Plaza Washington, El Paraiso, Caracas

Other

In the United States

 Washington (state)
 Washington Territory
 Washington-on-the-Brazos, Texas

Some of the locations below are named for George Washington:
the 241 townships in the United States named Washington; see Washington Township (disambiguation)
the 26 cities, 1 borough, and 1 village named Washington; see Washington (disambiguation)
the 2 villages and 1 borough named Washingtonville (disambiguation)
the 15 mountains, town, city, and four neighborhoods named Mount Washington

Outside the United States
Places named for George Washington outside of the United States include:
 George Washington, a small town in Cuba's Villa Clara Province
 George Washington Avenue (Spanish: Avenida George Washington) in Santo Domingo, Dominican Republic
 George Washington Avenue (Polish: Aleja Jerzego Waszyngtona) in Warsaw, Poland
 George Washington Roundabout (Polish: Rondo Jerzego Waszyngtona) in Warsaw, Poland
 George Washington Street (Serbian: Улица Џорџа Вашингтона/Ulica Džordža Vašingtona) in Belgrade, Serbia
 New Washington, a small town in Aklan Province, Philippines
 Washington Avenue (Italian: Viale Washington) in Rome, Italy
 Washington Avenue (German: Washington Allee) in Hamburg, Germany
 Washington Island, a coral atoll belonging to Kiribati
 Washington Street in Glasgow, Scotland, United Kingdom
 Washington Street (French: Rue Washington) in Paris, France; 8th arrondissement
 Washington Street (French: Rue Washington; Dutch: Washingtonstraat) in Ixelles, Brussels-Capital Region, Belgium
 Washington Street, Cork, in Cork, Ireland
 Washington Park (Spanish: Parque Washington) in Barranquilla, Colombia
 George Washington Street (Ukrainian: Вулиця Джорджа Вашингтона) in Lviv, Ukraine
 Washington Place, a village in Dasmariñas, Cavite, Philippines
 Cape Washington, in Antarctica and Greenland

See also
Washington (disambiguation)
George Washington (disambiguation)
List of George Washington articles
List of statues of George Washington
List of places named for Thomas Jefferson
List of places named for James Monroe
List of places named for Andrew Jackson
List of places named for James K. Polk
List of things named after Ronald Reagan
List of things named after George H. W. Bush
List of things named after Bill Clinton
List of things named after Barack Obama
List of things named after Donald Trump
Presidential memorials in the United States

References

George Washington
Washington
Washington, George